FC Jirama Antsirabe is a Malagasy football club based in Antananarivo, Madagascar.
The team currently plays in the Malagasy Second Division.

Stadium
Currently the team plays at the Antsirabe Stadium.

Performance in CAF competitions
CAF Cup: 1 appearance
2001 CAF Cup - first round

References

External links

Jirama Antsirabe
Antananarivo